|}

The International Hurdle is a Grade 2 National Hunt hurdle race in Great Britain which is open to horses aged four years or older. It is run on the New Course at Cheltenham over a distance of about 2 miles and 1 furlong (2 miles and 179 yards, or 3,382 metres), and during its running there are eight hurdles to be jumped. The race is scheduled to take place each year in December.

History
The event was established in 1963, and it was originally called the Cheltenham Trial Hurdle. The inaugural running was won by Scottish Memories, and in the following two years it was won by the Champion Hurdle winners Magic Court and Salmon Spray. Its title was changed to the Bula Hurdle in 1977, in honour of Bula, a dual-winner of the Champion Hurdle who was successful in this contest in 1972.

The first triple-winner of the Bula Hurdle was Bird's Nest, whose third victory came in 1980. This feat was matched in the late 1990s by Relkeel, a horse subsequently honoured by the naming of different race on the same card, the Relkeel Hurdle.

The online sportsbook StanJames.com sponsored the event for the first time in 2010. The International Hurdle is the second leg in the Road to Cheltenham, a Stan James sponsored series of top-class hurdles races culminating in the 2011 Champion Hurdle at the Cheltenham Festival. The other two races are the Fighting Fifth Hurdle and the Champion Hurdle Trial. The race is now sponsored by Stan James's parent company, Unibet

The last horse to win both the International Hurdle and the Champion Hurdle in the same season was Rooster Booster in 2002–03.

Records
Most successful horse (3 wins):
 Birds Nest – 1977, 1978, 1980
 Relkeel – 1997, 1998, 1999
 The New One – 2013, 2014, 2016

Leading jockey (6 wins):
 Richard Johnson – Relkeel (1997, 1999), Rooster Booster (2002), Detroit City (2006), Menorah (2010), The New One (2016)

Leading trainer (6 wins):

 Nicky Henderson – Geos (2000), Binocular (2008), Grandouet (2011), My Tent Or Yours (2017), Brain Power (2018), Call Me Lord (2019)

Winners

See also
 Horse racing in Great Britain
 List of British National Hunt races

References
 Racing Post:

External links
 Race Recordings 

National Hunt races in Great Britain
Cheltenham Racecourse
National Hunt hurdle races
Recurring sporting events established in 1963
1963 establishments in England